Ardrossan Montgomerie Pier railway station was a railway station serving the town of Ardrossan, North Ayrshire, Scotland as part of the Lanarkshire and Ayrshire Railway (L&AR). The station was opened to compete with the Glasgow and South Western Railway (G&SWR) owned station at Winton Pier on the opposite side of the harbour.

History
The station opened on 30 May 1890 as Ardrossan Pier, replacing the L&AR Ardrossan station as the new terminus for the line in Ardrossan (although that station would continue to operate as an intermediate station). It was closed from 1 January 1917 to 1 February 1919 due to wartime economy, and upon the grouping of the L&AR into the London, Midland and Scottish Railway (LMS) in 1923, the station was renamed Ardrossan Montgomerie Pier on 2 June 1924. The name change was to avoid confusion with the nearby G&SWR station of the same name, which was also incorporated into the LMS. Montgomerie Pier survived the former L&AR station closures of 1932,.

The station then passed on to the Scottish Region of British Railways on nationalisation in 1948, and continued to operate until it officially closed to passengers by the British Railways Board on 6 May 1968, although the last train ran on 25 September 1967. Despite track removal in 1970, the station was still intact in 1974. Today Montgomerie Pier is the site of private flats overlooking the Ardrossan Marina, and no trace of the station remains.

Station description
The station consisted of two side platforms in an iron-framed wooden-clad building, and originally had a glazed roof supported on lattice girders. A booking office for boats to Belfast was situated at the pier end of the platforms.

References

Notes

Sources
 
 
 
 Stations on navigable O.S. map. Disused station at end of branch north of harbour entrance'

Disused railway stations in North Ayrshire
Railway stations in Great Britain opened in 1890
Railway stations in Great Britain closed in 1917
Railway stations in Great Britain opened in 1919
Railway stations in Great Britain closed in 1968
1890 establishments in Scotland
1968 disestablishments in Scotland
Former Caledonian Railway stations
Beeching closures in Scotland
Ardrossan−Saltcoats−Stevenston